Phil Cahill (31 August 1899 – 8 September 1945) was an Irish hurler who played as a left wing-forward for the Tipperary senior team.

Cahill made his first appearance for the team during the 1922 championship and was a regular member of the starting fifteen until his retirement after the 1933 championship. During that time he won two All-Ireland medals, two Munster medals and one National League medal.

Cahill enjoyed a lengthy club career with Holycross–Ballycahill.

References

1899 births
1945 deaths
Holycross-Ballycahill hurlers
Tipperary inter-county hurlers
Munster inter-provincial hurlers
All-Ireland Senior Hurling Championship winners